Maceió, formerly sometimes Anglicised as Maceio, is the capital and the largest city of the coastal state of Alagoas, Brazil. The name "Maceió" is an Indigenous term for a spring. Most maceiós flow to the sea, but some get trapped and form lakes ("lagoas", in Portuguese).

There are numerous maceiós and lakes in this part of Brazil; because of this, the city was named Maceió, and the state, Alagoas. The new Zumbi dos Palmares International Airport connects Maceió with many Brazilian cities and also operates some international flights. The city is home to the Federal University of Alagoas.

Etymology
The name "Maceió" has origin in the term tupi maçayó or maçaio-k, that means "what it covers the swamp". The Aurélio Dictionary says that the term "maceió" means a temporary and cyclic lagoon that is located at the edge of the sea at the mouth of a watercourse small enough to be interrupted by a silicate bar until the high tide opens the way temporarily cyclically related to the season, river flow, lunar seasons, etc.

Nineteenth-century shipping reports, which reported on ships bringing cotton from Maceió, spelt it as Macaio.

History

The city began in an old sugar mill and plantation complex around the 19th century. Its development started with the arrival of ships taking wood from Jaraguá bay.

With the installation of the sugar mills, Maceió started to export sugar, then tobacco, coconut, leather, and some spices. Prosperity made it possible for the settlement to become a village on December 5, 1815. Thanks to its continued growth, Maceió became the capital of the Alagoas state on December 9, 1839.

Maceió is also a port city and due to its port development about 200 years ago it changed from a village into a city.

Geography
, its metropolitan area had a total population of 1,354,973 inhabitants.

Climate 
Maceió has a typical tropical climate, specifically a tropical monsoon climate (Köppen climate classification: Am), with very warm to hot temperatures and high relative humidity all throughout the year. However, these conditions are relieved by a near absence of extreme temperatures and trade winds blowing from the ocean.

The natural vegetation surrounding Maceió is tropical rainforest. The soil can be poor because high rainfall tends to leach out soluble nutrients.

Economy
One substantial local industry is based on chemical products from brine pumped from deep wells on the outskirts of Maceió. Another substantial industry is the production of ethanol and sugar from sugarcane grown in the region. In the last thirty years the tourist industry has transformed the coastal areas of the city into vibrant centers of entertainment for Brazilian and foreign tourists (Americans, Italians, French, Germans, Argentinians, etc.).

These coastal neighborhoods include coconut palm trees, playgrounds, squares, open-to-the-public football, volleyball, and basketball fields, residential buildings, bars, nightclubs, tourist-oriented shops, restaurants, banks, hotels, and gambling houses (slot machines and bingo only, since casino games are illegal in Brazil).

The GDP for the city was R$23,400,000,000; The per capita income for the city was R$22,976.51.

Strong point in the municipality's economy is tourism. Maceió has a great potential to attract tourists due to its natural beauties and great cultural diversity. In addition, Maceió offers several leisure options and modern spaces for business, such as the new Cultural and Exhibition Center of Maceió, in the Jaraguá District. In September 2005, the new Zumbi dos Palmares International Airport, one of the most modern in Brazil, was inaugurated. The Jaraguá neighborhood was very popular during the end of the 1990s, with large investments by the Maceió prefecture. Nowadays, the Jaraguá is a commercial district, equipped with banks, museums, pubs and colleges. Nordeste Invest, an event of tourism and real estate investments of international scope, happened in Maceió in the editions of years 2006 and 2009.

Gallery

Education
University level institutions include:

 Universidade Federal de Alagoas (UFAL);
 Universidade Estadual de Alagoas (Uneal);
 Universidade de Ciências da Saúde de Alagoas (Uncisal);
 Centro de Ensino Superior de Maceió (CESMAC);
 Faculdade de Alagoas (FAL);
 Instituto Federal de Alagoas (IFAL);
 Faculdade Maurício de Nassau
 Faculdade Pitágoras de Maceió

Top high schools of the city are: Maria Montessori (the best according to ENEM), Colégio Oswaldo Cruz (A.K.A. COC) Colégio Santa Úrsula, Colégio Intensivo, Colégio Marista de Maceió, Colégio Santa Madalena Sofia, Colégio Contato and others. (All private)

Culture

American jazz and rock and almost all Brazilian styles and dances are played all over the city in bars, pubs, restaurants, nightclubs, street festivals, concerts, private gatherings, and churches all the year round. Some classical music in concerts in the University, in the theater, and museums can also be heard.

Movie theaters can be found in the Maceió Shopping, Pátio Maceió, Parque Shopping Maceió and Farol malls.

Spetacles can be seen at the Deodoro Theatre and Gustavo Leite Theatre.

Théo Brandão Museum (folk and primitive arts), Museum of the Historical and Geografical Institute of Alagoas (fine arts and historical objects), Pierre Chalita Museum (fine arts), Museum of Image and Music (photographic, cinematographic, and sound exhibitions and archives), Museum of sport, Museum of natural history UFAL(museum which serves as the search for the Federal University of Alagoas).

Folk art in the Théo Brandão Museum, and in outdoor markets at Pajuçara Beach and Pontal da Barra where one can buy works by local folk artists.

The city is the seat of the Roman Catholic Archdiocese of Maceió.

Festa Junina
Festa Junina was introduced to Northeastern Brazil by the Portuguese for whom St John's day (also celebrated as Midsummer Day in several European countries), on June 24, is one of the oldest and most popular celebrations of the year. Differently from what happens on the European Midsummer Day, the festivities in Brazil do not take place during the summer solstice but during the tropical winter solstice. The festivities traditionally begin after June 12, on the eve of St Anthony's day, and last until the 29th, which is Saint Peter's day. During these fifteen days, there are bonfires, fireworks, and folk dancing in the streets (step names are in French, which shows the mutual influences between court life and peasant culture in the 17th, 18th, and 19th-century Europe). Typical refreshments and dishes are served. Like during Carnival, these festivities involve costumes-wearing (in this case, peasant costumes), dancing, heavy drinking, and visual spectacles (fireworks display and folk dancing). Like what happens on Midsummer and St John's Day in Europe, bonfires are a central part of these festivities in Brazil.

This is a typical Alagoas revelry that resulted from the union of Reisado (an Epiphany celebration), Auto dos Caboclinhos (Caboclinhos' Play), Chegança (public folk play depicting a naval battle) and Pastoril (outdoor folk play). Its choreography and costumes with colored ribbons and beads reproduce the cathedral's façades on the monumental hats covered with mirrors.

This is a dramatic dance motivated by the sea. It tells the sea adventures of the first navigators in its songs accompanied by guitar and ukulele.

Boi do Carnaval is a popular culture display derived from Bumba-Meu-Boi. It is always presented together with La Ursa (The Bear), Vaqueiro (Cowboy) and a percussion band whose rhythm captivates everyone that hears it.

Gogó da Ema was a famous palm tree with a crooked trunk roughly shaped like a curvilinear letter N. The tree fell on July 27, 1955 at 2:20 in the afternoon. It has become a symbol for Maceian culture and tourism, and there is a beach named after the celebrated tree. The tree also appears in folkloric art and music throughout northeastern Brazil.

Main sights

Maceió  is home to numerous beaches,  the color of sea varying from emerald green to blue; the water is always clear. The sand is white and there are many coconut plantations.

The Maceió sea has natural pools and reefs a few meters off the coast, that can be accessed by boat or raft sailings. The Mundaú lake is another option for sailing and bathing in transparent water.

Historical buildings include the Cathedral of Our Lady of Pleasures (1840),  the Deodoro Theatre, the Municipal Market, the Historical Institute Museum and the Floriano Peixoto Palace, seat of Alagoas State government.

Food
Gastronomy include fishes, shrimps, crabs and lobsters are some of Maceió's specialties. Fresh seafood is prepared from local recipes, such as tapioca, acaraje, carne-de-sol, cuscuz de tapioca. A kind of mollusk, the sururu, is appreciated in the city and is incorporated in many typical dishes.

Transportation

Public Transportation

Maceió is served by Maceió Urban Rail, a light rail system.

International Airport
Zumbi dos Palmares International Airport located outside Maceió serves the area with international connections to Lisbon in Portugal and Buenos Aires in Argentina, as well as cities throughout Brazil.

In 2021 the airport handled 1,893,812 passengers.

Port
The Port of Jaraguá is a Brazilian port located in Maceió. The commercial and economic development of the Port of Jaraguá, next to the margins of the Mundaú lagoon, was responsible for the emergence of an important settlement that received the name of Maceió and later became the present capital of Alagoas. The Port of Jaraguá is situated in a natural port area that facilitates the ships docking. During the Brazilian colonial period, the most important products exported from there port were sugar, tobacco, coconut and spices. The Biggest Cruise Ship to attract at port was MSC Seashore in 2022.

Highways
Maceió is connected to the main cities of Brazil by the BR-104, BR-101, BR-316 and AL-101 highways.  The distances to other Braziian cities are below.
Brasília: 2010 km (1249 mi);
Recife: 270 km (168 mi);
Aracaju: 290 km (180 mi);
Salvador: 610 km (379 mi).

Twin towns – sister cities
  Aracaju,  Brazil
  João Pessoa,  Brazil
  Gwangju,  South Korea
  Milan,  Italy

Neighbourhoods
There are today about 50 districts in Maceió:

Antares
Barro Duro
Bebedouro
Benedito Bentes
Bom Parto
Canaã
Centro de Maceió (Downtown)
Chã de Bebedouro
Chã da Jaqueira
Cidade Universitária
Clima Bom
Cruz das Almas
Farol
Feitosa
Fernão Velho
Garça Torta
Gruta de Lourdes
Guaxuma
Ipioca
Jacarecica
Jacintinho
Jaraguá
Jardim Petrópolis
Jatiúca
Levada
Mangabeiras
Mutange
Ouro Preto
Pajuçara
Pescaria
Pinheiro
Pitanguinha
Poço
Ponta da Terra
Ponta Grossa
Ponta Verde
Pontal da Barra
Prado
Petrópolis
Riacho Doce
Rio Novo
Santa Amélia
Santo Amaro
Santos Dumont
São Jorge
Serraria
Tabuleiro do Martins
Trapiche da Barra
Vergel do Lago.

Surrounding highlights

 Praia do Francês (French's Beach)
 Barra Nova (New Waterway)
 Dunas de Marapé (Dunes of Marapé)
 Nove Ilhas (Nine Islands)
 Massagüera (or Massagueira)
 Barra de São Miguel (San Miguel Waterway)
 Praia do Gunga (Gunga's Beach)
 Sonho Verde (Green Dream)
 Barra de Santo Antônio (Santo Antonio Waterway)
 Maragogi
 Murici
 Japaratinga
 Pontal do Coruripe
 Statue of Liberty replica in front of Museu da Imagem e do Som de Alagoas (Museum of Image and Sound of Alagoas).

Notable people

 Bruna Tenório, fashion model.
 Cacá Diegues, film director.
 Celso Brandão, photographer.
 Djavan, singer and musician.
 Fernando Collor de Mello, brazilian president from 1990 - 1992.
 Floriano Peixoto, second president of the Brazilian republic.
 Graciliano Ramos, brazilian writer and journalist.
 Hermeto Pascoal, musician.
 Zagallo (Mário Jorge Lobo Zagallo), football coach.
 Marta Viera da Silva aka 'Marta', often regarded as the greatest female footballer of all time and named FIFA world player of the year six times.
 Nise da Silveira, psychiatrist.
 Képler Laveran Lima Ferreira aka 'Pepe', footballer.
 Pontes de Miranda, jurist.
 Roberto Firmino, footballer.
 Roberval Davino, football coach.
 Teotonio Vilela, "Menestrel das Alagoas".
Manuel Deodoro da Fonseca, First Brazilian President

References

External links 

  Tourism Maceió
  AboutBrasil/Maceió
  City Tour
  Hotels in Maceió
  Only Maceió
  Neighborhoods of Maceió
  Apartments in Maceió
  Events in Maceió
   Restaurants in Maceió
   About Maceió

 
Populated coastal places in Alagoas
Municipalities in Alagoas